General Philip Henry Sheridan, also known as the Sheridan Memorial, is an outdoor bronze sculpture of Philip Sheridan by Joseph Pollia, located in Christopher Park in Manhattan, New York. The statue was installed in 1936.

See also

 1936 in art
 Sheridan Circle

References

External links
 
 Christopher Park/Sheridan Square by Sascha Zuger (2011), Moon New York State (pg. 49)
 The History of Sheridan Square (August 1, 2011), Greenwich Village Society for Historic Preservation

1936 establishments in New York City
1936 sculptures
Bronze sculptures in Manhattan
Monuments and memorials in Manhattan
Outdoor sculptures in Manhattan
Sculptures of men in New York City
Statues in New York City
West Village